The 2004 Trophée Éric Bompard was the fifth event of six in the 2004–05 ISU Grand Prix of Figure Skating, a senior-level international invitational competition series. It was held at the Palais Omnisports Paris Bercy in Paris on November 18–21. Medals were awarded in the disciplines of men's singles, ladies' singles, pair skating, and ice dancing. Skaters earned points toward qualifying for the 2004–05 Grand Prix Final. The compulsory dance was the Rhumba.

The competition was named after the Éric Bompard company, which became its chief sponsor in 2004.

Results

Men

Ladies

Pairs

Ice dancing

External links
 2004 Trophée Éric Bompard

Internationaux de France
Trophée Éric Bompard, 2004
Figure
Trophée Éric Bompard
Trophée Éric Bompard
Figure skating in Paris
International figure skating competitions hosted by France